Ludwig Sauerhöfer (5 March 1883 – 15 October 1914) was a German wrestler. He competed in the lightweight event at the 1912 Summer Olympics. He was killed in action in World War I.

See also
 List of Olympians killed in World War I

References

External links
 

1883 births
1914 deaths
Olympic wrestlers of Germany
Wrestlers at the 1912 Summer Olympics
German male sport wrestlers
Sportspeople from Ludwigshafen
People from the Palatinate (region)
German military personnel killed in World War I